The 1962 Lady Wigram Trophy was a motor race held at the Wigram Airfield Circuit on 20 January 1962. It was the eleventh Lady Wigram Trophy to be held and was won by Stirling Moss in the Lotus 21.

Classification

References

Lady Wigram Trophy
Lady
January 1962 sports events in New Zealand